Manjari (mən'jə'ri:) is a word of Sanskrit origin that primarily means a collection. e.g."katha manjari" (= a collection of stories like Hitopadesha). 

Manjari is used in many  languages of Indian subcontinent like Nepali, Hindi ("phool manjari" meaning a collection of flowers or bouquet) and Kannada ("chitra manjari" meaning a collection of pictures i.e. a movie). 

Manjari also refers to flowers in general, mango flowers and creepers. A similar name is "Manjiri", which is a Marathi name. "Maanjar" in Marathi means cat too. Also, the hazel eyes are called "Manjari aankhe" in Hindi.

References

Definitions